Dileepa Jayalath (born 7 September 1997) is a Sri Lankan cricketer. He made his Twenty20 debut for Bloomfield Cricket and Athletic Club in the 2018–19 SLC Twenty20 Tournament on 15 February 2019. He made his List A debut for Bloomfield Cricket and Athletic Club in the 2018–19 Premier Limited Overs Tournament on 10 March 2019. He made his first-class debut for Bloomfield Cricket and Athletic Club in Tier B of the 2018–19 Premier League Tournament on 22 March 2019.

References

External links
 

1997 births
Living people
Sri Lankan cricketers
Bloomfield Cricket and Athletic Club cricketers
Place of birth missing (living people)